Raymond Robert Rogers is a professor and chair of geology at Macalester College. He earned his B.S. in geology from Northern Arizona University in 1985, his M.S. from the University of Montana in 1989, and his Ph.D. from the University of Chicago in 1995 Rogers' specializations are as a sedimentary geologist and taphonomist, with a focus on the study of terrestrial and marginal marine depositional systems, particularly those with abundant fossils. He is one of the editors of the book Bonebeds: Genesis, Analysis, and Paleobiological Significance, from the University of Chicago Press (2008).

References
Notes

Sources
Bonebeds: Genesis, Analysis, and Paleobiological Significance, Raymond R. Rogers, David A. Eberth and Anthony R. Fiorillo, University of Chicago Press, 2008, 

American geologists
Living people
Macalester College faculty
Northern Arizona University alumni
University of Chicago alumni
University of Montana alumni
Taphonomists
Year of birth missing (living people)